Liutger, also spelled Liudger, Ludger, or Leodegar, Latinized as Lutegerus, is a German male personal name, composed of liut 'people' and ger 'spear'.

 Saint Ludger (died 809), Frisian missionary and the first bishop of Münster
 Lutegerus is the putative author of MS I.33
 Leodegar (615-679), Burgundian bishop
 Leodegario Santa Cruz (born 1988), Mexican boxer

Germanic given names